The Ersuic languages (Ersu; also called Duoxu or Erhsu) are a Qiangic language cluster of the Sino-Tibetan language family. Ersu languages are spoken by about 20,000 people in China as reported by 
. Muya (alternatively Menia or Menya) is reported to be related, but it is not known how it fits in.

Ersuic speakers live in the western part of China's Sichuan province (several counties within the Garzê Tibetan Autonomous Prefecture, Liangshan Yi Autonomous Prefecture, and the prefecture-level city of Ya'an). Most of them are classified by the Chinese government as members of the Tibetan ethnic group, although some also are registered as Han Chinese. Older adults mostly use Ersu, but younger people also use Chinese or Yi.

The Ersu Shaba script of the shābā religious books is a pictographic system of proto-writing. The system, in which the color of the characters has an effect on the meaning, was inspired by Chinese writing and was created in the 11th century.

Languages
There are three Ersuic languages.

Ersu 尔苏 (Eastern Ersu) – 13,000 speakers
Lizu 傈苏, 里汝, 吕苏 (Western Ersu) – 4,000 speakers; 7,000 speakers
Tosu 多续 (Central Ersu) – 3,000 speakers; almost none remaining

 classifies Ersu languages as follows, with defining innovations given in parentheses.

Proto-Ersuic
Tosu
Ersu (ja- adjective prefix)
Hanyuan 汉源
Zeluo 则落 / Qingshui 清水 (*ui- > ri-, *tɕ- > ts-, etc.)
Lizu (*j- > ɲ-, *Ke > Kɯ, *riu > ri)
Mianning 冕宁 (alveopalatal split)
Central (*st- > k-, *HC- > C-)
Naiqu 乃渠
Kala 卡拉 (from )
Kala 卡拉 (from )

Grammar
Ersu is a subject–object–verb language. It has three tones.

Further reading

References

Works cited

External links
 ELAR archive of Ersu language documentation materials
 List of Proto-Ersuic reconstructions (Wiktionary)

Qiangic languages
Endangered Sino-Tibetan languages
Languages of China